General elections were held in Myanmar on 8 November 2015, with the National League for Democracy winning a supermajority of seats in the combined national parliament. Voting occurred in all constituencies, excluding seats appointed by the military, to select Members of Assembly to seats in both the upper house (the House of Nationalities) and the lower house (the House of Representatives) of the Assembly of the Union, and State and Region Hluttaws. Ethnic Affairs Ministers were also elected by their designated electorates on the same day, although only select ethnic minorities in particular states and regions were entitled to vote for them.

These polls were the first openly contested election held in the country since 1990, which was annulled by the military government after the National League for Democracy's (NLD) victory. The poll was preceded by the 2010 general election, which was marred by a boycott and widespread allegations of systematic fraud by the victorious Union Solidarity and Development Party (USDP).

The NLD won a sweeping victory, taking 86 percent of the seats in the Assembly of the Union (235 in the House of Representatives and 135 in the House of Nationalities), well more than the 67 percent supermajority needed to ensure that its preferred candidates would be elected president and second vice president in the Presidential Electoral College.  While the NLD only needed a simple majority to carry on the normal business of government, it needed at least 67 percent to outvote the combined pro-military bloc in the Presidential Electoral College (the USDP and the appointed legislators representing the military). Although NLD leader Aung San Suu Kyi is constitutionally barred from the presidency (as both her late husband and her children are foreign citizens), she was made the de facto head of government, after being appointed to a newly created office, the State Counsellor of Myanmar.

Preparation 
As the election approached, the ruling Union Solidarity and Development Party confirmed it would contest its winning constituencies from 2010. The opposition National League for Democracy party confirmed it would contest even if a constitutional measure barring Aung San Suu Kyi from running for president was not amended.

The National Unity Party confirmed it would review its winning seats from 2010 and would consider other constituencies to challenge. The National Democratic Force said the party was prepared to challenge in as many as 200 constituencies but was still determining candidates. Ethnic political groups would contest in each state based on ethnic party strongholds, although some indicated they would consider forming an alliance as the Federal Union Party.

Before the election, 91 political parties were registered to take part in 2015.

In July 2015, Myanmar's Union Election Commission (UEC) designated the number of constituencies for running in the 2015 general election of four levels of parliamentary representatives: 330 constituencies for elections to the House of Representatives (the lower house), 168 for the House of Nationalities (the upper house), 644 for the State and Regional Hluttaws (local parliaments) and 29 for ethnic ministers of the local parliaments. The UEC also issued procedures for international observers to follow in monitoring the election, which was preliminarily scheduled for the end of October or the beginning of November.

The Union Election Commission cancelled elections in Kyethi and Mong Hsu townships in Shan State following armed clashes between the Tatmadaw and the insurgent Shan State Army - North. Despite calls by the Shan State Progressive Party to proceed with the elections, the UEC has denied the request, stating that it is not possible to hold free and fair elections in these areas. Elections were further cancelled in some villages in Hopang, Namtit, both of which fall within the nation's Wa Self-Administered Division, and under the control of the insurgent United Wa State Army. The cancellation of these elections will see the vacancy of 7 seats in the House of Representatives and 14 seats in the Shan State Hluttaw.

Cancellation of by-elections 
By-elections had been scheduled to be held in November or December 2014, to elect members for six seats in the House of Nationalities, 13 in the House of Representatives, and 11 in state and regional legislatures. The seat vacancies were primarily the result of their former holders' moves to ministerial posts or departmental positions within government, but also included some other constituencies where representatives had died. The by-elections were expected to indicate the relative strengths of the contending parties, including President Thein Sein's Union Solidarity and Development Party (USDP) and the opposition National League for Democracy (NLD) party led by Aung San Suu Kyi.

On 7 September 2014, the Union Election Commission cancelled the by-election because the period for campaigning would take place too close to that of the general elections in 2015 and because the results would therefore not have had any political significance.

Possible presidential candidates

Before election 
In the event of a USDP victory, President Thein Sein was considered the frontrunner to continue as President after the election. Commander-in-Chief of the Military Min Aung Hlaing is close to retirement and was another favourite for the presidency, but may assume the role after a transitional period headed by another ex-military figure. Aung San Suu Kyi has reiterated her desire to become the next president but constitutional changes need to take place before she would be allowed to run. Although Parliament voted against most constitutional amendments on 25 June 2015 meaning that Aung San Suu Kyi cannot become president in the election, Suu Kyi later stated that she would be "above the President" if the NLD won the elections.

Shwe Mann, the former No. 3 in the junta who is now speaker of House of Representatives, considered reform-minded, was the most likely figure to take the mantle from Thein Sein until he was removed from his position within the party on 12 August 2015.

After election 
While National League for Democracy leader Aung San Suu Kyi is constitutionally barred from the presidency, former commander-in-chief of Tatmadaw Tin Oo, Aung San Suu Kyi's personal physician Tin Myo Win, Htin Kyaw, Myo Aung and Tin Mar Aung are mentioned as possible presidential picks and Khun Htun Oo, Sai Nyunt Lwin and Aye Thar Aung are mentioned as possible vice presidential picks after the election. On 10 March 2016, Htin Kyaw and Henry Van Thio were nominated as the Vice Presidents of Myanmar by NLD. Htin Kyaw was elected as the ninth president of Myanmar on 15 March 2016 by 360 of the 652 MPs at the Assembly of the Union; Aung San Suu Kyi was appointed as the State Counsellor, a position similar to Prime Minister, on 6 April 2016.

Results 

The National League for Democracy (NLD) obtained a majority of the total seats in both the House of Nationalities and the House of Representatives of the Assembly of the Union, which is enough for its nominees to win election as president and first vice president in the Presidential Electoral College, and for control over national legislation.

The NLD also received a majority of total combined seats in the State and Regional Hluttaws, including 21 of 29 Ministers of Ethnic Affairs. With the final tally of all elected seats (township and ethnic), it is believed they will have the ability to control most local governments and parliaments, either entirely on its own or with the support of ethnic parties. The exceptions to this are the Rakhine State Hluttaw, where the Arakan National Party won a plurality of total seats and is expected to govern with the NLD's support, and the Shan State Hluttaw, where the USDP (which won a plurality of elected seats) and Military Representatives control roughly equal seats to the combined total of the various other parties, led by the Shan Nationalities League for Democracy and the NLD in second and third place, respectively.

House of Nationalities 

168 of the 224 seats in the House of Nationalities (Amyotha Hluttaw) were up for election. The remaining 56 seats (25%) were not elected, and instead reserved for military appointees (taken from Tatmadaw personnel; officially known as "Defence Services Personnel Representatives"). There are 12 members elected per state/region, including one member from each self-administered zone.

The list of military appointees was published as the UEC Announcement 2/2016.

House of Representatives 
There are 330 of 440 seats in the House of Representatives (Pyithu Hluttaw) that are elected, of which 323 were filled after seven seats were cancelled due to the ongoing armed insurgencies in Shan State. The remaining 110 seats (25%) were not elected, and instead reserved for military appointees (taken from Tatmadaw personnel; officially known as "Defence Services Personnel Representatives"). Members are elected to constituencies based on township and population.

The list of military appointees was published as the UEC Announcement 1/2016.

State and Regional Hluttaws 
There are 644 district seats (out of a total of 864) in the State and Regional Hluttaws, or Local Assemblies, of which 630 were up for election after 14 seats were cancelled due to the ongoing armed insurgencies in Shan State. These figures exclude the 29 elected Ethnic Affairs Ministers, who have different election parameters and their accountability solely to an ethnic electorate, but also sit alongside the elected district and appointed military members of their respective state/region. There are two members are elected for each township of the state/region. The remaining 220 seats (approximately 25% of each assembly) were not elected, and instead reserved for military appointees (taken from Tatmadaw personnel; officially known as "Defence Services Personnel Representatives").

The list of military appointees was published as the UEC Announcement 3/2016.

Ethnic Affairs Ministers 
29 Ministers of Ethnic Affairs for the State and Regional Assemblies were up for election.

"Under the 2008 Constitution, ethnic affairs ministers are elected to a given state or division if that division is  an ethnic minority population of 0.1 percent or greater of the total populace [roughly 51,400 people]. If one of the country's ethnic minorities counts a state as its namesake, however, it is not granted an ethnic affairs minister (e.g., there is no Mon ethnic affairs minister in Mon State). Only voters who share an ethnic identity with a given ethnic affairs minister post are allowed to vote for candidates to the position." Ministers are not elected for ethnicities that are a majority of their state or region, or where a state/region already has a self-administered region or self-administered division dedicated to those ethnic groups.

Reactions 
On 9 November 2015, former chairperson of the Union Solidarity and Development Party and Speaker of the House of Representatives, Shwe Mann, conceded defeat to the National League for Democracy's Than Nyunt in his hometown constituency of Phyu, announcing on his Facebook that he had 'personally congratulated' his opponent for the victory.

On 9 November 2015, acting chairperson of the Union Solidarity and Development Party, Htay Oo, announced that the party had conceded defeat in a statement to Reuters.

On 11 November 2015, chairperson of the National League for Democracy, Aung San Suu Kyi, called for 'national reconciliation' talks with incumbent president, Thein Sein, commander-in-chief of the Myanmar Armed Forces, Senior General Min Aung Hlaing, and Speaker of the House of Representatives, Shwe Mann to be set for a later date. All have accepted her invitation.

On 12 November 2015, incumbent President of Myanmar, Thein Sein, who has led political reforms during his tenure, congratulated Aung San Suu Kyi and her party on his Facebook, promising that his current government will 'respect and obey' the election results and 'transfer power peacefully'. Commander-in-chief of the Myanmar Armed Forces, Senior General Min Aung Hlaing, also took to his Facebook to congratulate Suu Kyi, vowing that the Tatmadaw will co-operate with the new government following the transition. This was after a meeting conducted within the Tatmadaw's top ranks.
US President Barack Obama and UN Secretary-General Ban Ki-moon congratulated Suu Kyi on her victory and praised Thein Sein for his organisation of the election. Suu Kyi also received calls from French President François Hollande, British Prime Minister David Cameron, Indian Prime Minister Narendra Modi and Philippine President Benigno Aquino III.

Political transition 
Myanmar's recent political history is underlined by its struggle to establish democratic structures amidst conflicting factions. This political transition from a closely held military rule to a free democratic system is widely believed to be determining the future of Myanmar. The resounding victory of Aung San Suu Kyi’s National League for Democracy in 2015 general elections has raised hope for a successful culmination of this transition.

The 2017 murder of Ko Ni, a prominent Muslim lawyer and a key member of Myanmar’s governing National League for Democracy party and the Rohingya genocide is seen as a serious blow to the country’s fragile democracy. Mr. Ko Ni’s murder has caused fears about the removal of a trusted advisor for Aung San Suu Kyi, particularly in regards to reforming Myanmar’s military-drafted Constitution and ushering the country to democracy.

Controversy 
Controversy has been raised over such issues as inaccurate voter lists, cancellation of voting in some violent areas, vilification of Burmese Muslims as a campaign tool, and the ineligibility to vote of the Muslim Rohingyas. According to The Economist, "No matter how many millions of Burmese vote against the Union Solidarity and Development Party, which rules the country and is backed by the army, the army will remain the real power in Myanmar."

There have been allegations of fraud in many townships where unknown ballots cast as advance votes boosted the results of the Union Solidarity Development Party. The Union Election Commission has defended these votes, stating that they had arrived before the polling booths closed, and thus they were legitimate votes. In Lashio, where the National League for Democracy was expected to win, there are allegations of voting fraud which pulled USDP candidate and incumbent vice-president Sai Mauk Kham forward by more than 4000 votes. The NLD, Shan Nationalities League for Democracy and Shan Nationalities Democratic Party have agreed to file a complaint with the Union Election Commission. The UEC responded by declaring that the victory of Sai Mauk Kham was legal and that no fraud had taken place.

Notes

References

Elections in Myanmar
Myanmar
General
Burmese democracy movements